This is a list of upper stages used on rockets.

Upper stages

bold denotes active configurationsitalics denotes configurations in development

See also
 Multistage rocket
 Apogee kick motor
 Space tug
 Lists of rockets
 List of orbital launch systems
 Comparison of orbital launchers families
 Comparison of orbital launch systems
 Comparison of space station cargo vehicles
 List of space launch system designs
 Lists of spacecraft

References

Space launch vehicles
Lists of spacecraft
Lists of rockets